The 2023 Tirreno–Adriatico was a road cycling stage race that took place between 6 and 12 March 2023 in Italy. It was the 58th edition of the Tirreno–Adriatico and the seventh race of the 2023 UCI World Tour.

Teams 
All 18 UCI WorldTeams and seven UCI ProTeams made up the 25 teams that participated in the race.

UCI WorldTeams

 
 
 
 
 
 
 
 
 
 
 
 
 
 
 
 
 
 

UCI ProTeams

Route

Stages

Stage 1 
6 March 2023 — Lido di Camaiore,  (ITT)

Stage 2 
7 March 2023 – Camaiore to Follonica,

Stage 3 
8 March 2023 – Follonica to Foligno,

Stage 4 
9 March 2023 – Greccio to Tortoreto,

Stage 5 
10 March 2023 – Morro d'Oro to Sarnano-Sassotetto,

Stage 6 
11 March 2023 – Osimo Stazione to Osimo,

Stage 7 
12 March 2023 – San Benedetto del Tronto to San Benedetto del Tronto,

Classification leadership table

Classification standings

General classification

Points classification

Mountains classification

Young rider classification

Team classification

References

External links 
 

2023
Tirreno–Adriatico
Tirreno–Adriatico
Tirreno–Adriatico